Scalable Linear Recording is the name used by Tandberg Data for its line of QIC based tape drives.

The earliest SLR drive, the SLR1, has a capacity of 250 MB, while the latest drive, the SLR140, has a capacity of 70 GB. The term SLR is often used to refer to QIC tapes, as for many years they were the only drives that used them before Tandberg discontinued production around 2015.

Generations

Quarter inch formats

NOTE: MLR stands for Multi-channel Linear Recording.

Eight millimeter formats

External links
 SLR5 specsheet
 SLR7 specsheet
 SLR24 specsheet
 SLR32 specsheet
 SLR40 specsheet
 SLR50 specsheet
 SLR60 specsheet
 SLR75 specsheet
 SLR100 specsheet
 SLR140 specsheet

Tandberg